The 2013 Grote Prijs Jef Scherens was the 47th edition of the Grote Prijs Jef Scherens cycle race and was held on 15 September 2013. The race started and finished in Leuven. The race was won by Bert De Backer.

General classification

References

2013
2013 in road cycling
2013 in Belgian sport